Tizio, Caio, Sempronio (Italian equivalent of "Tom, Dick, and Harry") is a 1951 Italian film.

Cast

External links
 

1951 films
1950s Italian-language films
Italian black-and-white films
1951 comedy films
Italian comedy films
1950s Italian films